Events from the year 1924 in the United States.

Incumbents

Federal Government 
 President: Calvin Coolidge (R-Massachusetts)
 Vice President: vacant
 Chief Justice: William Howard Taft (Ohio)
 Speaker of the House of Representatives: Frederick H. Gillett (R-Massachusetts)
 Senate Majority Leader: Henry Cabot Lodge (R-Massachusetts) (until November 9), vacant (starting November 9)
 Congress: 68th

Events

January–March
 February 7 – Death penalty: The first state execution using gas in the United States takes place in Nevada.
 February 12 – Rhapsody in Blue, by George Gershwin, is first performed in New York City at Aeolian Hall.
 February 14 – IBM is founded in New York State.
 February 16–February 26 – Dock strikes break out in various U.S. harbors.
 February 22 – Calvin Coolidge becomes the first President of the United States to deliver a radio broadcast from the White House.
 March 8 – The Castle Gate mine disaster kills 172 coal miners in Utah, United States.

April–June
 April 16 – American media company Metro Goldwyn Mayer (MGM) is founded in Los Angeles, California.
 May 3 – The Aleph Zadik Aleph, the oldest Jewish youth fraternity, is founded in Omaha, Nebraska.
 May 10 – J. Edgar Hoover is appointed head of the Federal Bureau of Investigation.
 May 21 – University of Chicago students Richard Loeb and Nathan Leopold, Jr. murder 14-year-old Bobby Franks, in a thrill killing.
 May 26 – The Asian Exclusion Act is enacted, banning all Asian immigration to the United States. It was a slap in the face to Japan after their participation as a principal ally in WWI, and is seen as the spark that spurred Japan's alliance with Germany and down the path to World War II.
 June 2 – U.S. President Calvin Coolidge signs the Indian Citizenship Act of 1924 into law, granting citizenship to all Native Americans born within the territorial limits of the United States.
 June 12 – Rondout Heist: Six men of the Egan's Rats gang rob a mail train in Rondout, Illinois; the robbery is later found to have been an inside job.
 June 23 – American airman Russell L. Maughan flies from New York to San Francisco in 21 hours and 48 minutes on a dawn-to-dusk flight in a Curtiss pursuit.
 June 24-July 9 – The 1924 Democratic National Convention takes a record 103 ballots, to nominate John Davis for President.

July–September
 September 9 – The Hanapepe Massacre occurs on Kauai, Hawaii.

October–December
 October 9 – Soldier Field, the home of the Chicago Bears opens.
 October 10
 The Alpha Delta Gamma fraternity is founded at the Lake Shore Campus of Loyola University, Chicago.
 The Washington Senators defeat the New York Giants (baseball), 4 games to 3.
 November 4 
 U.S. presidential election, 1924: Republican Calvin Coolidge defeats Democrat John W. Davis and Progressive U. S. Senator Robert M. La Follette
 Nellie Tayloe Ross of Wyoming is elected as the first woman governor in the United States.
November 15 – In Los Angeles, silent film director Thomas Ince ("The Father of the Western") meets  publishing tycoon William Randolph Hearst to work out a deal. When Ince dies a few days later, reportedly of a heart attack, rumors soon surface that he was murdered by Hearst.
 November 27 – In New York City the first Macy's Thanksgiving Day Parade is held.
 December 1 – George Gershwin's Lady Be, Good, including the song "Fascinating Rhythm", (book by Guy Bolton and Fred Thompson, lyrics by Ira Gershwin) premieres in New York City.

Undated
 Alice Vanderbilt Morris, a wealthy heiress, founds the International Auxiliary Language Association in New York City.
 U.S. bootleggers begin to use Thompson submachine guns.
 The earth inductor compass is developed by Morris Titterington at the Pioneer Instrument Company in Brooklyn, New York.

Ongoing
 Lochner era (c. 1897–c. 1937)
 U.S. occupation of Haiti (1915–1934)
 Prohibition (1920–1933)
 Roaring Twenties (1920–1929)

Births

January

 January 1 – Charlie Munger, American businessman and philanthropist
 January 4 
 Walter Ris, American freestyle swimmer (d. 1989)
 Charles Thone, American politician (d. 2018)
 January 5 – Glenn Boyer, American historian and author (d. 2013)
 January 6 – Earl Scruggs, American musician (d. 2012)
 January 7 – Gene L. Coon, American screenwriter and producer (d. 1973)
 January 8 – James Clinkscales Hill, American jurist (d. 2017)
 January 9 – Mary Kaye, American guitarist and singer (d. 2007)
 January 10
 Earl Bakken, American engineer and businessman, inventor of the modern Artificial pacemaker (d. 2018)
 Max Roach, African-American percussionist, drummer and composer (d. 2007)
 January 11
 Don Cherry, American pop singer (d. 2018)
 Sam B. Hall, American politician (d. 1994)
 Slim Harpo, American musician (d. 1970)
 January 12 – Chris Chase (also known as Irene Kane), American model, film actress, writer and journalist (d. 2013)
 January 14 
 Carole Cook, American actress and singer (d. 2023)
 Guy Williams, American actor (d. 1989)
 January 19 – Nicholas Colasanto, American actor and television director (d. 1985)
 January 23 – Frank Lautenberg, American politician (d. 2013)
 January 25
 Lou Groza, American football player and coach (d. 2000)
 Rollie Seltz, American basketball player (d. 2022)
 Speedy West, American musician (d. 2003)
 January 26 – Annette Strauss, American philanthropist and politician (d. 1998)
 January 28 – Betty Tucker, American female baseball player (d. 2012)
 January 30
 Lloyd Alexander, American writer (d. 2007)
 Dorothy Malone, American actress (d. 2018)

February

 February 1 – Richard Hooker, American writer and surgeon (d. 1997)
 February 4 – Dorothy Harrell, American female professional baseball player (d. 2011)
 February 7 – Catherine Small Long, American politician (d. 2019)
 February 8 – Joe Black, African-American baseball player (d. 2002)
 February 10 – Randy Van Horne, American singer and musician (d. 2007)
 February 11 – Budge Patty, American tennis player (d. 2021)
 February 14 – Gabe Pressman, American journalist (d. 2017)
 February 15 – Toni Arden, American singer (d. 2012)
 February 16 – Frank Saul, American basketball player (d. 2019)
 February 17 – Margaret Truman, American novelist and only child of U.S. President Harry S. Truman and Bess Truman (d. 2008)
 February 19 – Lee Marvin, American actor (d. 1987)
 February 20
 Donald M. Fraser, American politician (d. 2019)
 Gerson Goldhaber, German-American physicist and astrophysicist (d. 2010)
 Gloria Vanderbilt, American socialite, artist and fashion designer (d. 2019)
 February 21 – William Hathaway, American politician and lawyer (d. 2013)
 February 28 
 Bettye Ackerman, American actress (d. 2006)
 Christopher C. Kraft Jr., American aerospace engineer (d. 2019)
 February 29 – Al Rosen, American baseball player (d. 2015)

March

 March 1 – Deke Slayton, American astronaut (d. 1993)
 March 3 – Isadore Singer, American mathematician (d. 2021)
 March 4 – Kenneth O'Donnell, American political consultant, aide to U.S. President John F. Kennedy (d. 1977)
 March 6 
 Ed Mierkowicz, American baseball player (d. 2017)
 William H. Webster, American lawyer and jurist 
 March 9 
 Herbert Gold, American novelist 
 George Haines, American swimmer and coach (d. 2006)
 William Hamilton, American theologian (d. 2012)
 Ben Schadler, American basketball player (d. 2015)
 March 12 – Helen Parrish, American actress (d. 1959)
 March 17 – Edith Savage-Jennings, African-American civil rights leader (d. 2017)
 March 20 – Philip Abbott, American actor (d. 1998)
 March 22
 Al Neuharth, American businessman and journalist (d. 2013) 
 Bill Wendell, American TV announcer (d. 1999)
 Lionel Wilson, American voice actor (d. 2003)
 March 23 – Bette Nesmith Graham, American typist, commercial artist, and inventor (d. 1980)
 March 24
 Lois Andrews, American actress (d. 1968)
 Norman Fell, American actor (d. 1998)
 March 25
 Roberts Blossom, American actor and poet (d. 2011)
 Julia Perry, African-American composer (d. 1979)
 March 27 – Sarah Vaughan, African-American jazz singer (d. 1990)
 March 28 – Byrd Baylor, American novelist, essayist and author (d. 2021)
 March 29 – Jimmy Work, American singer-songwriter (d. 2018)
 March 31 – Kathleen O'Malley, American actress (d. 2019)

April

 April 1 – Brendan Byrne, American politician, statesman, and prosecutor (d. 2018)
 April 2 – Delwin Jones, American politician (d. 2018)
 April 3 – Marlon Brando, American actor (d. 2004)
 April 4 
 Gil Hodges, American baseball player (d. 1972)
 Joye Hummel, American comic book author (d. 2021)
 Noreen Nash, American actress 
 April 6 – Jimmy Roberts, American singer (d. 1999)
 April 8 – Bob Mann, American football player (d. 2006)
 April 9 – Milburn G. Apt, American test pilot (d. 1956)
 April 13
 Jack Chick, American fundamentalist Christian illustrator and publisher (d. 2016)
 Stanley Donen, American film director and choreographer (d. 2019)
 April 16 
 Henry Mancini, American composer and arranger (d. 1994)
 Rudy Pompilli, American musician (d. 1976)
 April 18
 Clarence "Gatemouth" Brown, American blues musician (d. 2005)
 Henry Hyde, American politician (d. 2007)
 April 23 
 Chuck Harmon, American baseball player and scout (d. 2019)
 Bobby Rosengarden, American jazz drummer (d. 2007)
 April 28 – Emily W. Sunstein, American campaigner, political activist and biographer (d. 2007)

May

 May 1
 Art Fleming, American actor and game show host (d. 1995)
 Evelyn Boyd Granville, American mathematician, computer scientist and academic 
 Big Maybelle, American R&B singer (d. 1972)
 May 2 – Ladislava Bakanic, American gymnast (d. 2021)
 May 3 – Isadore Singer, American mathematician (d. 2021)
 May 6 – Patricia Kennedy Lawford, American socialite (d. 2006)
 May 11 – Ninfa Laurenzo, American businessman, founder of Ninfa's (d. 2001)
 May 16 – Frank Mankiewicz, American journalist, presidential campaign press secretary (d. 2014)
 May 18
Jack Barlow, American country music singer (d. 2011)
 Priscilla Pointer, American actress
 Jack Whitaker, American sportscaster (d. 2019)
 May 21 – Peggy Cass, American actress and comedian (d. 1999)
 May 24 – Philip Pearlstein, American soldier, painter (d. 2022)
 May 29 – Pepper Paire, American female baseball player (d. 2013)
 May 31 – Patricia Roberts Harris, American administrator (d. 1985)

June

 June 1 – William Sloane Coffin, American clergyman (d. 2006)
 June 3
 Bernard Glasser, American film producer, director (d. 2014)
 Herk Harvey, American film director (d. 1996)
 Jimmy Rogers, American musician (d. 1997)
 June 4 – Dennis Weaver, American actor (d. 2006)
 June 5
 Lou Brissie, baseball player and scout (d. 2013)
 Art Donovan, American football player and radio host (d. 2013)
 June 6 
 Robert Abernathy, American science fiction author (d. 1990)
 W. Marvin Watson, American presidential advisor, Postmaster General (d. 2017)
 June 7 – Edward Field, poet and author
 June 8
 Sheldon Allman, American-Canadian actor and singer-songwriter (d. 2002)
 Lyn Nofziger, American journalist and author (d. 2006)
 David Pines, American physicist (d. 2018)
 June 12 – George H. W. Bush, American politician, 41st President of the United States from 1989 to 1993 & 43rd Vice President of the United States from 1981 to 1989 (d. 2018)
 June 20 – Chet Atkins, American guitarist, record producer (d. 2001)
 June 22 – John C. Whitcomb, American theologian (d. 2020)
 June 23
 Frank Bolle, American comic strip artist, comic book artist and illustrator (d. 2020)
 June Brooks, American businesswoman (d. 2010)
 June 24
 Leonard Everett Fisher, American artist known best for children's books
 Yoshito Takamine, American politician (d. 2015)
 June 25
 Martin J. Klein, American historian and physicist (d. 2009)
 Sidney Lumet, American film director (d. 2011)
 June 27
 Charles Norman Shay, American Penobscot tribal elder, writer and decorated veteran of both World War II and the Korean War
 Paul Conrad, American cartoonist (d. 2010)
 June 26 
 Richard Bull, American actor (d. 2014)
 James W. McCord Jr., American CIA officer (d. 2017)
 June 29
 Philip H. Hoff, American politician (d. 2018)
 Ezra Laderman, American composer (d. 2015)

July

 July 1
 Ralph Parr, American double-flying ace (d. 2012)
 Curtis W. Harris, American minister, civil rights activist and Virginia politician (d. 2017)
 Richard Longaker, American political scientist (d. 2018)
 July 2 – Charley Winner, American football player
 July 4 – Eva Marie Saint, American actress
 July 6 
 Ernest Graves Jr., United States Army officer (d. 2019)
 Robert Michael White, American military aircraft test pilot, fighter pilot, electrical engineer and major general (d. 2010)
 July 7 – Sam Cathcart, American football halfback, defensive back (d. 2015)
 July 8 – Charles C. Droz, American politician 
 July 10 – Gloria Stroock, American actress
 July 11
 F. James Rutherford, American science professor (d. 2021)
 Oscar Wyatt, American businessman, self-made millionaire
 Al Federoff, American professional baseball infielder, manager (d. 2011)
 July 12 – Shirley Neil Pettis, American politician (d. 2016)
 July 14
 Val Avery, American character actor (d. 2010)
 Warren Giese, American football player, coach and politician (d. 2013)
 July 15 – Jeremiah Denton, American politician (d. 2014)
 July 16
 James L. Greenfield, American administrator
 Bess Myerson, American politician, model and television actress (d. 2014)
 July 18 – Will D. Campbell, American minister, author and activist (d. 2013)
 July 19
 Pat Hingle, American actor (d. 2009)
 Frank Ivancie, American businessman and politician (d. 2019)
 Arthur Rankin Jr., American film director, producer and co-founder of Rankin/Bass Productions (d. 2014)
 July 20 – Lola Albright, American singer, actress (d. 2017)
 July 21 – Don Knotts, American comedic actor (d. 2006)
 July 22 – Margaret Whiting, American singer (d. 2011)
 July 23 – Avern Cohn, American judge (d. 2022)
 July 24 – Paul Meier, American statistician (d. 2011)
 July 25 – Frank Church, American politician (d. 1984)
 July 28
 Anne Braden, American civil rights activist (d. 2006)
 C. T. Vivian, American civil rights activist, minister and author (d. 2020)
 July 29
Lillian Faralla, American female professional baseball player (d. 2019)
 Robert Horton, American actor, singer (d. 2016)
 July 30 – William H. Gass, American novelist (d. 2017)

August

 August 1 
 Marcia Mae Jones, American actress (d. 2007)
 Frank Havens, American canoeist (d. 2018)
 Michael Stewart, American playwright, stage librettist (d. 1987)
 August 2
 James Baldwin, African-American author and civil rights activist (d. 1987)
 Joe Harnell, American pianist and composer (d. 2005)
 Carroll O'Connor, American actor, producer and director (d. 2001)
 August 3 – Leon Uris, American writer (d. 2003)
 August 6 – Ella Jenkins, American folk singer of children's music
 August 8 –  Gene Deitch, American illustrator, animator and film director (d. 2020)
 August 9 – Marta Becket, American dancer (d. 2017)
 August 10 – Martha Hyer, American actress (d. 2014)
 August 15 – Phyllis Schlafly, American activist (d. 2016)
 August 16
 Fess Parker, American actor and businessman (d. 2010)
 Inez Voyce, American female baseball player (d. 2022)
 Benny Bartlett, American child actor and musician (d. 1999)
 August 17 
 Evan S. Connell, Jr., American fiction writer and poet (d. 2013)
 Charles Simmons, American author (d. 2017)
 August 18 – Frank Logue, 25th mayor of New Haven, Connecticut (d. 2010)
 August 20 – Frank Joseph Guarini, American politician 
 August 23
 Elaine Sturtevant, American artist (d. 2014)
 Robert Solow, American economist, Nobel Prize laureate
 August 24 – Louis Teicher, American pianist (Ferrante & Teicher) (d. 2008)
 August 26 – Barbara Staff, American political activist (d. 2019)
 August 29
 Clyde Scott, American athlete (d. 2018)
 Dinah Washington, African-American singer, pianist (d. 1963)
 August 31 
 Buddy Hackett, American actor, comedian (d. 2003)
 Thomas J. Hudner Jr., American naval aviator (d. 2017)

September

 September 1 – Diana Decker, American-English actress and singer (d. 2019)
 September 2 – Sidney Phillips, American physician, WW2 Marine documentary consultant (d. 2015)
 September 3 – Mary Grace Canfield, American actress (d. 2014)
 September 5 
 Paul Dietzel, American college football coach (d. 2013)
 Roy Andrew Miller, American linguist (d. 2014)
 September 6
 John Melcher, American politician (d. 2018)
 Dale E. Wolf, American businessman and politician (d. 2021)
 September 7 – Daniel Inouye, American politician (d. 2012)
 September 8 – Wendell H. Ford, American politician (d. 2015)
 September 9
 Jane Greer, actress (d. 2001)
 Sylvia Miles, actress (d. 2019)
 Russell M. Nelson, heart surgeon and religious leader
 September 11
 Daniel Akaka, soldier, engineer and politician (d. 2018)
 Tom Landry, football player and coach (d. 2000)
 September 12 – Howard C. Nielson, politician (d. 2021)
 September 13 – Scott Brady, actor (d. 1985)
 September 14 – Jerry Coleman, baseball player, manager, broadcaster, and Marine aviator (d. 2014)
 September 15 – Bobby Short, entertainer (d. 2005)
 September 16 – Lauren Bacall, actress (d. 2014)
 September 20 
 Gogi Grant, singer (d. 2016)
 Helen Grayco, singer, actress (d. 2022)
 September 22
 J. William Middendorf, soldier and politician 
 Gerald Schoenfeld, chairman (d. 2008)
 September 27 
 Wendell Bell, futurist (d. 2019)
 Fred Singer, Austrian-American physicist and academic (d. 2020)
 September 28 – Merwin Coad, politician
 September 30
 Truman Capote, author (d. 1984)
 Georgiana Young, actress (d. 2007)

October

 October 1
 Jimmy Carter, 39th President of the United States from 1977 to 1981
 William Rehnquist, 16th Chief Justice of the Supreme Court (d. 2005)
 Roger Williams, American pianist (d. 2011)
 October 2 – Ruby Stephens, American female baseball player (d. 1996)
 October 3 – Harvey Kurtzman, American editor, cartoonist and creator of Mad (d. 1993)
 October 5 – Bill Dana, American comedian, actor, screenwriter (d. 2017)
 October 7 – Joyce Reynolds, American actress (d. 2019)
 October 9 – Arnie Risen, American basketball player (d. 2012)
 October 10
 David Shepherd, American producer, director and actor (d. 2018)
 Ed Wood, American filmmaker, actor, writer, producer and director (d. 1978)
 October 11 – Mal Whitfield, American Olympic athlete (d. 2015)
 October 13 – Terry Gibbs, American vibraphone player and bandleader 
 October 14 – Robert Webber, American actor (d. 1989)
 October 15
 Warren Miller, American ski and snowboarding filmmaker (d. 2018)
 Lee Iacocca, American automobile executive (d. 2019)
 Mark Lenard, American actor (d. 1996)
 October 17 – Fredd Wayne, American actor (d. 2018)
 October 18 
 Arthur J. Jackson, American military officer (d. 2017)
 Buddy MacMaster, American artist (d. 2014)
 October 21 – Joyce Randolph, American actress
 October 24 – Earl Palmer, American R&B Drummer (d. 2008)
 October 25 
 Billy Barty, American actor (d. 2000)
 Bobby Brown, baseball player (b. 2021)
 Weston E. Vivian, American politician (d. 2020)
 October 27 – Bonnie Lou, American singer (d. 2015)

November

 November 6
 Harlon Block, U.S. Marine flag raiser on Iwo Jima (d. 1945)
 November 10 – Russell Johnson, American actor (d. 2014)
 November 11 – Leonard D. Wexler, American judge (d. 2018)
 November 13 – Edward F. Welch, Jr., American admiral (d. 2008)
 November 16 – Sam Farber, American businessman, co-founder of OXO (d. 2013)
 November 19 – J. D. Sumner, American gospel singer (d. 1998)
 November 20 – Mark Miller, American actor 
 November 21 – Joseph Campanella, American actor (d. 2018)
 November 22 
 Geraldine Page, American actress (d. 1987)
 Robert M. Young, American film director and producer
 November 24
 James M. Burns, American attorney and judge (d. 2001)
 Joanne Winter, American female professional baseball pitcher, LPGA player (d. 1996)
 November 25 – Paul Desmond, American jazz alto saxophonist and composer (d. 1977)
 November 26 – Ruth Bradley Holmes, linguist (d. 2021)
 November 28 – Calvin J. Spann, African-American Tuskegee Airman, fighter pilot (d. 2015)
 November 29 – Irv Noren, American baseball and basketball player (d. 2019)
 November 30 
 Shirley Chisholm, American politician (d. 2005)
 Allan Sherman, American comedy writer, television producer and song parodist (d. 1973)

December

 December 2 – Alexander Haig, American politician, U.S. Secretary of State (d. 2010)
 December 4 – John C. Portman Jr., American architect (d. 2017)
 December 6 – Wally Cox, American television, motion picture actor (d. 1973)
 December 9 – Frank Sturgis, one of the five Watergate burglars whose capture led to the end of the American Presidency of Richard Nixon (d. 1993)
 December 12 – Ed Koch, American politician (d. 2013)
 December 13
 Robert Coogan, American actor (d. 1978)
 Maria Riva, American actress 
 December 17 – Margaret Wigiser, American female professional baseball player (d. 2019)
 December 19 – Cicely Tyson, American actress (d. 2021)
 December 23 – Bob Kurland, American basketball player (d. 2013)
 December 25 – Rod Serling, American television screenwriter (The Twilight Zone) (d. 1975)
 December 26 – Frank Broyles, American college football coach, athletic director (d. 2017)
 December 27
 James A. McClure, American politician (d. 2011)
 Frank North, American football coach (d. 2017)
 December 31
 Frank J. Kelley, 50th Michigan Attorney General (d. 2021)
 Taylor Mead, American actor (d. 2013)
 J. Donald Monan, American academic administrator (d. 2017)
 Lawrence W. Pierce, American judge (d. 2020)
 Robert Ravenstahl, American politician (d. 2015)

Deaths

 January 4 – John Peters, baseball shortstop (born 1850)
 January 12 – William V. Allen, U.S. Senator from Nebraska from 1893 to 1899. (born 1847)
 January 13 – Albert Abrams, quack doctor (born 1863)
 January 14 – Luther Emmett Holt, pediatrician (born 1855)
 February 1 – Maurice Prendergast, painter (born 1858)
 February 3 – Woodrow Wilson, 28th President of the United States from 1913 to 1921 and historian (born 1856)
 February 8 – Henry B. Quinby, governor of New Hampshire (born 1846)
 February 16
 Henry Bacon, Beaux-Arts architect of the Lincoln Memorial (born 1866)
 John William Kendrick, railroad executive (born 1853)
 March 9 – Daniel Ridgway Knight, painter (born 1839)
 March 13 – Josephine St. Pierre Ruffin, African American civil rights campaigner and publisher (born 1842)
 April 1 – Frank Capone, gangster, shot by police (born 1895) 
 April 7 – Marcus A. Smith, U.S. Senator from Arizona from 1912 to 1921 (born 1851)
 April 17 – Jane Kelley Adams, educator (born 1852)
 April 19 – Paul Boyton, extreme water sports pioneer (born 1848 in Ireland)
 April 14 – Louis Sullivan, architect, "father of skyscrapers" (born 1856)
 April 18 – Frank Xavier Leyendecker, illustrator (born 1877)
 April 20 – Caroline Ingalls (b. Caroline Lake Quiner), pioneer, mother of author Laura Ingalls Wilder (born 1839)
 April 21 – Eleonora Duse, Italian actress (born 1858 in Italy)
 April 23 – Bertram Goodhue, neo-gothic architect (born 1869)
 April 24 – G. Stanley Hall, psychologist (born 1844)
 April 27 – Maecenas Eason Benton, U.S. Representative from Missouri (born 1848)
 May 5 – Kate Claxton, stage actress (born 1848)
 May 10 – George Kennan, explorer (born 1845)
 May 11 – Moses Fleetwood Walker, baseball pitcher and Black nationalist (born 1856)
 May 13 – Alva Smith, Nebraska politician (born 1850)
 May 31 – Charles Stockton, admiral (born 1845)
 July 6 – Black Benny (Williams), bass drummer (born. c.1890)
 July 14 – Isabella Stewart Gardner, art collector and philanthropist (born 1840)
 July 23 – Frank Frost Abbott, classical scholar (born 1860)
 August 7 – John Edward Bruce ("Bruce Grit"), African American slave and historian (born 1856)
 August 25 – Velma Caldwell Melville, editor and writer (born 1858)
 September 1 – Samuel Baldwin Marks Young, general, first Chief of Staff of the United States Army (born 1840)
 September 15 – Frank Chance, baseball player (born 1877)
 September 17 – John Martin Schaeberle, German-born astronomer (born 1853 in Germany)
 September 25 – Lotta Crabtree, stage actress (born 1847)
 October 25 – Laura Jean Libbey, novelist (born 1862)
 October 27 –  Percy Haughton, baseball player and coach (born 1876)
 October 29 – Frances Hodgson Burnett, children's novelist (born 1849 in the United Kingdom)
 November 3 – Cornelius Cole, U.S. Senator from California from 1867 to 1873 (born 1822)
 November 9 – Henry Cabot Lodge, U.S. Senator from Massachusetts from 1893 to 1924 (born 1850)
 November 10 – Dean O'Banion, gangster, killed (born 1892)
 November 19 – Thomas H. Ince, silent film producer, "father of the Western" (born 1882)
 November 21 – Florence Harding, née Kling, First Lady of the United States from 1921 to 1923 as wife of Warren G. Harding, 29th President (born 1860)
 December 6 – Gene Stratton-Porter, novelist and naturalist (born 1863)
 December 13 – Samuel Gompers, labor leader (born 1850)
 December 15 
 T. Frank Appleby, United States Congressman from New Jersey from 1921 to 1923. (born 1864)
 William Herbert Carruth, linguist and poet (born 1859)
 December 19 – Stephen Warfield Gambrill, U.S. Congressman for Maryland's 5th District (born 1873)

See also
 List of American films of 1924
 Timeline of United States history (1900–1929)

References

External links
 

 
1920s in the United States
United States
United States
Years of the 20th century in the United States